The Eldercare Workforce Alliance (EWA), a project of the Tides Center, is a coalition of 28 US national organizations that came together to focus on short- and long-term healthcare workforce issues relating to older adults.

Overview
In response to the Institute of Medicine's report Retooling for an Aging America: Building the Healthcare Workforce, over twenty organizations that represent consumers, family caregivers, the direct care workforce, and healthcare professions, joined together with the aim of delivering high-quality care to an aging population.  As the baby-boomers retire, caring for the America's older adults will become a growing challenge.

The organization supports additional training in geriatrics for health care professionals, including home care workers and revising the companionship exemption, a provision in the Fair Labor Standards Act that excludes home care aides from receiving minimum wage and overtime protections.  In February 2013 the Eldercare Workforce Alliance wrote on this topic in a Huffington Post article titled "The State of Quality Care Demands Quality Jobs".

Member organizations
The Eldercare Workforce Alliance consists of 28 organizations:

AARP
Alzheimer's Association
Alzheimer's Foundation of America
AMDA: LTC Medicine
American Academy of Nursing
American Association for Geriatric Psychiatry
American Geriatrics Society (Alliance Co-Convener)
American Health Care Association and National Center for Assisted Living
American Nurses Association
American Physical Therapy Association
American Psychological Association
American Society of Consultant Pharmacists
American Society on Aging
Coalition of Geriatric Nursing Organizations
Council on Social Work Education
Direct Care Alliance
Family Caregiver Alliance
Gerontological Society of America
LeadingAge
National Alliance for Caregiving
National Association for Geriatric Education
The National Consumer Voice for Quality Long-Term Care
National Council on Aging
National Hispanic Council on Aging
NCB Capital Impact/THE GREEN HOUSE Project
 New York Academy of Medicine/Social Work Leadership Institute
 PHI - Quality Care through Quality Jobs (Alliance Co-Convener)
Service Employees International Union
U.S. Department of Veterans Affairs (Federal Liaison)

References

External links 

 "Retooling for an Aging America: Building the Health Care Workforce", 2008

Medical and health organizations based in Washington, D.C.